"Gold Digger" is the lead single from EPMD's third album, Business as Usual. It was produced by EPMD with scratches provided by fellow group member DJ Scratch and was the duo's first of two singles to make it to #1 on the Hot Rap Singles.

Single track listing

A-Side
"Gold Digger" (E & P Remix)- 4:15  
"Gold Digger" (Vocal)- 5:11

B-Side
"Rap Is Outta Control" (Vocal)- 3:06  
"Gold Digger" (Instrumental)- 5:11  
"Gold Digger" (E & P Remix Instrumental)- 4:15

Charts (1990-1991)

1990 singles
EPMD songs
Songs written by Erick Sermon
1990 songs
Def Jam Recordings singles
Columbia Records singles
Songs written by PMD (rapper)